Leeming Bar is a village in the civil parish of Aiskew and Leeming Bar, in the Hambleton District of North Yorkshire, England. The village lay on the original Great North Road (Dere Street) before being bypassed. It is now home to a large industrial estate and the main operating site of the Wensleydale Railway. It is in the historic North Riding of Yorkshire.

Governance
An electoral ward in the same name exists. This ward stretches north to Kirkby Fleetham with a total population of approximately 1800 (as of 2005) and of 1,966 at the 2011 census.

Geography
Leeming Bar's name is derived from the fact that it housed a Toll-House with a barrier that travellers were expected to pay at for onward travel beyond the barrier. Around 1840, the barrier was moved further south towards Leeming village, as a quirk in the local bye-laws meant that people did not have to pay for travelling within  of the crossroads on either Dere Street or the Bedale to Northallerton road.

Located just to east of the A1(M) motorway and near RAF Leeming, it is home to the main depot of the Wensleydale Railway at Leeming Bar railway station as well as the Dales & District bus company. It was first bypassed in 1961, again in 2012, and lies on the Roman road Dere Street. It is approximately  along the old A684 from the village of Aiskew and  along the same road from the town of Northallerton. The A684 bypass was opened up in August 2016.

Amenities
It used to have a C of E church, St Augustine's, which was last used for religious services in 2010. The tied C of E primary School with an average of 100 pupils remains. There are three pubs, two of which, the  Reubens Inn on Bedale Road, and the Corner House are also  hotels. A new Co-op store was opened up at the junction of Roman Road and Bedale Road in the village in July 2017.

The Leeming Bar service station was set up at the junction of the old A1 road and the A684 road on the western edge of the village in 1961. In 2012, it won an appeal to become an official motorway service station and was sold to Moto in 2014. The Services now lie on the adjacent A6055 local access road that has a junction with the A1(M) just to the north of Leeming Bar (junction 51).

A second service station with access to the A684 and the A1(M) at junction 51 was opened at Coneygarth in December 2014. The Coneygarth Truck Stop is run by Exelby Services who closed down their refuelling point in nearby Londonderry to run the new service station. The site is just to the north of Leeming Bar village.

Industry

An industrial agricultural business trades alongside the main road in Leeming Bar. John H Gill & Son have been in the village since 1937 when they bought out the foundry of F Mattison & Co. Run by William Mattison, the company made much agricultural machinery at their foundry which was built on railway land at Leeming Bar. However, the company was known mostly for its cast-iron mileposts, of which about 100 survive across North Yorkshire.

Leeming Bar is host to an industrial estate that houses, among other things, the headquarters of Froneri, who make Fab and Rowntree's Fruit Pastilles ice lollies. A household waste recycling site is also on the industrial estate.

The Vale of Mowbray food factory is also in the village. The factory has suffered two fires in the 21st century; in 2002 a major fire caused an industrial oven to explode and led to the company being prosecuted by the Health and Safety Executive. In 2017, another fire led to 10,000 smoke damaged pork pies being destroyed by the company.

References

External links

 The Lodge
 Aiskew Leeming Bar C of E primary school

Villages in North Yorkshire
Hambleton District